The Age of A.I. is an eight-episode American science documentary streaming television series narrated and hosted by American actor Robert Downey Jr. The show covers the applications of artificial intelligence (AI) in various fields, like health, robotics, space-travel, food, disaster-prevention, and others. Each 30-45 minute episode covers several different areas of AI implementation under one broader topic.

Episodes
Each episode opens with a short scene of Robert Downey Jr., in which he frames the topic of the episode. Each episode then covers several related topics in separate parts, usually returning to the first topic during the final section of the episode.

Interviews

Production

Development 

The series was developed by the production companies Team Downey, Sonar Entertainment, and Network Entertainment. The episodes were released in two batches for YouTube Premium users, with the first four being released on December 18, 2019 and the latter four being released on January 15, 2020. The episodes were made available for non-YouTube Premium subscribers with a new episode being released each week, starting on December 18, 2019.

Casting 
Upon announcement of the series, multiple commentators noted the parallels between Robert Downey Jr.'s role in The Age of A.I., and his portrayal of Tony Stark in the Marvel Cinematic Universe (MCU) media franchise. In both roles, Downey is associated with advanced technology that is used to enhance human life. These sources also noted the coverage of AI in the MCU, in which Stark accidentally helped create Ultron, an AI villain.

Reception 
In an article from Decider's "Stream It Or Skip It" series, they claim that you should stream the show. They also write that the show is a good watch for anyone over the age of ten who is interested in AI. Common Sense Media gave the show four out of five stars, and said it was appropriate for those eleven years and older.

References

External links
 The Age of A.I. on YouTube 

2010s YouTube series
2019 web series debuts
Documentary web series
American non-fiction web series
2020s YouTube series
YouTube Premium original series
2020 web series endings